A special election was held in  to fill the vacancy left by George Thatcher (F) declining to serve a 7th term, having served continuously since the 1st Congress and, after the death of Thomas Hartley (F) in  on December 21, 1800, the last remaining member of the 1st Congress to have continuously served in the House.  The election was held on June 22, 1801

Election results

Cutts took his seat with the rest of the 7th Congress at the start of the 1st session.

See also
List of special elections to the United States House of Representatives

References

United States House of Representatives 1801 14
Massachusetts 1801 14
Massachusetts 1801 14
1801 14
Massachusetts 14
United States House of Representatives 14